Daniel Reilly (born July 24, 1989) is an American politician and a Republican member of the Rhode Island House of Representatives representing District 72.

Education
Reilly graduated from Providence College in 2012.

Elections

2014 Reilly ran unopposed for the 2014 Republican Primary and won the November 6, 2014 General election with 3114 votes (54%) against Linda Finn Democratic Incumbent candidate who lost with 2640 votes (45.8%).

References

External links
 Official Page at the Rhode Island General Assembly
Daniel Reilly at Ballotpedia

Place of birth missing (living people)
1989 births
Living people
Republican Party members of the Rhode Island House of Representatives
Providence College alumni
Roger Williams University alumni
People from Portsmouth, Rhode Island
21st-century American politicians